Fisherman Island or Fisherman's Island may refer to:
 Fisherman Island (Queensland), Australia
 Fisherman Island (New Zealand)
 Fisherman's Island, on Lake Pend Oreille, Idaho, United States
 Fisherman Island (Maine), United States
 Fisherman Island (Michigan), United States
 Fisherman's Island State Park, Michigan
 Fisherman Island (Virginia), United States

See also
 Fisher Island (disambiguation)